Eupithecia graphata is a moth in the family Geometridae. bIt was described by Treitschke in 1828. It is found in most of southern and eastern Europe, as well as the Near East.

Adults are on wing from April to May and again from July to August.

The larvae feed on Minuartia and Gypsophila species, as well as Jurinea mollis and Spergularia segetalis. Larvae can be found in July and August.

Subspecies
Eupithecia graphata graphata
Eupithecia graphata albofasciata Staudinger, 1879
Eupithecia graphata hesperia Wehrli, 1926
Eupithecia graphata olympica Tuleschkov, 1951
Eupithecia graphata setaceata Dietze, 1903
Eupithecia graphata sproengertsi Dietze, 1910

References

Moths described in 1828
graphata
Moths of Europe
Moths of Asia
Taxa named by Georg Friedrich Treitschke